Baldwin van Holland (died 30 April 1196 in Mainz) was a bishop of Utrecht from 1178 to 1196

Baldwin was the son of Dirk VI, Count of Holland and Sophia of Rheineck, and brother to counts Otto van Bentheim and Floris III, Count of Holland. Before Baldwin became bishop of Utrecht, he had been Archbishop of Bremen and chaplain of Henry the Lion. With a relative as Bishop, the count of Holland was about to expand his power in Utrecht. During his rule Baldwin was involved in struggles with Otto I, Count of Guelders over the Veluwe and Salland, and with the lords of Groningen and Coevorden. These wars resulted in numerous raids and plunders in the Oversticht, which weighed heavily on the bishopric's finances. After his death Baldwin was interred in St. Martin's Cathedral, Utrecht.

1196 deaths
12th-century Roman Catholic bishops in the Holy Roman Empire
Prince-Bishops of Utrecht
Burials at St. Martin's Cathedral, Utrecht
Year of birth unknown